This is a list of active and extinct volcanoes in Georgia.

References

Georgia (country)
 
Volcanoes